Vanmeekanathar Temple is a Siva temple in Tiruvetriyur in Sivagangai district in Tamil Nadu (India).

Vaippu Sthalam
It is one of the shrines of the Vaippu Sthalams sung by Tamil Saivite Nayanar Sambandar and Sundarar.

Presiding deity
The presiding deity is known as Vanmeekanathar. His consort is known as Bagampiriyal. Local people call this place as Bagampiriyal Temple.

Shrines
In the Prakaram shrines of Vinayaka, Subramania, Bairava, Sanisvara and Navagraha are found.

References

Shiva temples in Sivaganga district
Hindu temples in Sivaganga district